Tregoss is a hamlet in the parish of Roche, Cornwall, England, United Kingdom. To the east is Tregoss Moor.

References

Hamlets in Cornwall